Aslan Karatsev defeated Andy Murray in the final, 6–3, 6–3 to win the men's singles title at the 2022 Sydney Tennis Classic. This was Murray's first ATP final since he won the 2019 European Open.

Alex de Minaur was the defending champion from when the event was held in 2019, but withdrew before the tournament began.

Seeds
The top four seeds receive a bye into the second round.

Draw

Finals

Top half

Bottom half

Qualifying

Seeds

Qualifiers

Lucky losers

Qualifying draw

First qualifier

Second qualifier

Third qualifier

Fourth qualifier

References

External links
Main draw
Qualifying draw

2022 Sydney Tennis Classic
Sydney Tennis Classic
Sydney